In the Open is a 2011 drama film directed by Hernán Belón, written by Hernán Belón and Valeria Radivo and starring Leonardo Sbaraglia, Dolores Fonzi and Matilda Manzano.

The film premiered at the 2011 Reykjavík International Film Festival. In the Open was released on May 3, 2012.

Cast 
 Leonardo Sbaraglia as Santiago
 Dolores Fonzi as Elisa
 Matilda Manzano as Matilda
 Pochi Ducasse as Odelsia (as Pochi Ducase)
 Juan Villegas as Alberto
 Javier Volá as Playero
 Rodolfo Benegas as Mozo (as Rodolfo Raúl Benegas)

References

External links
 

2011 films
2011 drama films
Argentine drama films
2010s Spanish-language films
2010s Argentine films